Adolfas Večerskis (born 4 September 1949 in Kretinga), is a Lithuanian movie and stage actor, director and translator. He began his career in films, but later chose to play mainly on the stage. Večerskis, his wife Viola, and their younger daughter Juta live in Vilnius, where he is the General Director of the Lithuanian National Drama Theatre. He is a judge on the show Lithuania's Got Talent.

Studies 
Večerskis studied at the Lithuanian State Conservatory. He completed actor studies in 1973 and manager studies for theatre director in 1988. In 1993 Večerskis studied art management at the Art Institute of New York City. In 1996 he received a management certificate from the Baltic Management Fund.

Career 
1973–1991 – performed various roles at the Lithuanian National Drama Theatre 
1992 – opened Vaidilos ainiai, his own private theatre (in 1997 renamed as A. Večerskis Theatre)
1995–2000 – manager of an international project theatre without borders
1998 – manager of Kretinga Theatre Festival
1998 – appointed as the Program Chief of the Lithuanian National Drama Theatre

Important plays 
1994 – Gyvenimo miražas
1996 – Paskutinė meilės naktis at Vaidilos ainiai, based on a play by Miguel Delibes
1997 – Aukščiausioji terapija at A. Večerskis Theatre, based on Beyond Therapy by Christopher Durang
1998 – Bill Manhof Neatidarykite durų po vidurnakčio at A. Večerskis Theatre
2002 – Bamba, based on Le Nombril by Jean Anouilh
2003 – Grobis, based on Loot by Joe Orton
2005 – Meilė pagal grafiką,  based on Run for Your Wife by Ray Cooney

TV
2007-2009: TV series Nekviesta meilė as Antanas Baronas

External links 
  Lists of performances
  Short bio
  Article on Večerskis

1949 births
Living people
Male actors from Vilnius
Lithuanian male film actors
Lithuanian theatre directors
Lithuanian translators
Lithuanian Academy of Music and Theatre alumni
Lithuanian male stage actors
People from Kretinga